Küman (also, Koman) is a village and municipality in the Lerik Rayon of Azerbaijan. It has a population of 186.

References

Populated places in Lerik District